Mount Cross is a mountain in Antarctica,  high, standing  northeast of King Ridge in the Anderson Hills, in the central Patuxent Range of the Pensacola Mountains. It was mapped by the United States Geological Survey from surveys and from U.S. Navy air photos, 1956–66, and named by the Advisory Committee on Antarctic Names at the suggestion of Captain Finn Ronne, a U.S. Navy Reserve and the leader at Ellsworth Station in 1957. Allan S. Cross assisted in planning the medical supplies, in providing instruction in first aid, and in selecting trail rations for the Ronne Antarctic Research Expedition of 1947–48.

References 

Mountains of Queen Elizabeth Land
Pensacola Mountains